Ferréol Cannard (born May 28, 1978 in Morez) is a retired French biathlete. He celebrated his biggest triumphs with the French relay team at the 2006 Olympics in Turin, where he won a bronze medal with the French relay team. He also got a bronze medal with the French team at the World Championships 2004 in Oberhof.

References 
 
 

1978 births
French male biathletes
Olympic bronze medalists for France
Olympic biathletes of France
Biathletes at the 2006 Winter Olympics
Biathletes at the 2002 Winter Olympics
Living people
Olympic medalists in biathlon
Biathlon World Championships medalists
Medalists at the 2006 Winter Olympics